The Chennai Egmore–Karaikal Kamban Express is an Express train belonging to Southern Railway zone that runs between  and  in India. It is currently being operated with 16175/16176 train numbers on a daily basis.

History 
During meter gauge services, this train ran as a regular express train from karaikudi to chennai via thiruthuraipoondi, tiruvarur, Nagapattinam, Nagore, karaikal, thirunallaru, mayladuthurai, villupuram in the name of kamban express. This train got its name kamban express because one of the famous tamil poet kamban's tomb is situated at nattarasan kottai near karaikudi and kambar birth is located at thiruvezhumbur near kuthalam, as this train passes through these two important places in the history of kamban, so this train got its name as kamban express. Later during 1989, the peralam karaikal line closed for train service, so this train is attached with a slip coaches dedicated for Nagore while the remaining rakes of the express train has been sent to karaikudi via tiruthuraipoondi. During those times, this train is numbered as 6175/76. After the conversion to broad-gauge of all railway lines, except the thiruvarur karaikudi section, all the other meter gauge railway tracks are converted to broad gauge around 2010 itself. But the thiruvarur karaikudi section underwent gauge conversion during 2013 only. In this intermediate period(2010), the kamban express was allocated to run between karaikal to chennai egmore via nagore, thiruvarur, mayiladuthurai, villupuram which is its old slip coach route and a new slip coach route from nagapattinam to velankanni as velankanni express. Around 2019 gauge conversion of the thiruvarur karaikudi section is completed and opened for passenger traffic and the peralam karaikal line also underwent reconstruction and gauge conversion process and it is expected to be completed by 2025. Now railways plans to reoperate this train to its very old route via chennai egmore, villupuram, mayiladuthurai, peralam, thirunallaru, karaikal, thiruvarur, thiruthuraipoondi, karaikudi after the gauge conversion completes on the peralam karaikal section in order not to eliminate and avoid any stoppages for this train.

Service

The 16175/Chennai Egmore–Karaikal Kamban Express has an average speed of 42 km/hr and covers 361 km in 8h 30m. The 16176/Karaikal–Chennai Egmore Kambam Express has an average speed of 44 km/hr and covers 361 km in 8h 15m.

Route and halts 

The important halts of the train are:

Coach composition

The train has standard ICF rakes with a max speed of 110 kmph. The train consists of 23 coaches:

 1 AC II Tier
 2 AC III Tier
 13 Sleeper coaches
 5 General Unreserved
 2 Seating cum Luggage Rake

Traction

Both trains are hauled by a Royapuram Loco Shed-based WAP-7 electric locomotive from Chennai to Karaikal and vice versa.

Rake sharing

The train shares its rake with 16187/16188 Tea Garden Express and 56385/56386 Ernakulam–Kottayam Passenger. Till 2020, it ran with link express coaches bound Velankanni which will be attached & detached at Nagappattinam. From there,both the trains reaches their destination as single trains. 

Now the link train service to Velankanni was discountinued permanently, and it runs as a single train from Chennai to Karaikal & Vice Versa. It also shares it's rakes with 16187/88 Karaikal - Ernakulam Junction Tea Garden Express.

Direction reversal

The train reverses its direction 1 times:

See also 

 Chennai Egmore railway station
 Karaikal railway station
 Chennai Egmore–Velankanni Link Express
 Tea Garden Express

Notes

References

External links 

 16175/Chennai Egmore–Karaikkal Express India Rail Info
 16176/Karaikkal–Chennai Egmore Express India Rail Info

Transport in Chennai
Transport in Karaikal
Express trains in India
Rail transport in Tamil Nadu
Rail transport in Puducherry
Railway services introduced in 2010